Tages may refer to:
 Tages, a founding prophet of Etruscan religion
 Tagès, a software copyright protection system
 Tages (band)
 Tages-Anzeiger, a Swiss newspaper
 Erynnis tages, a butterfly
 Tagetes, a plant genus